Meliza Bañales is an American writer, performer, and slam poet. She has lived in the San Francisco Bay Area, Santa Cruz, and Los Angeles.

Writing 
Bañales has been involved in spoken-word and writing since 1996. She gained recognition for being the first Latina on the West Coast to win a poetry slam championship in 2002. She was the 2002 winner of the People Before Profits Poetry Prize.  Her poems have appeared in many magazines and anthologies, including  Revolutionary Voices: A Multicultural Queer Youth Anthology, Without A Net: The Female Experience of Growing-Up Working-Class, Baby Remember My Name: New Queer Girl Writing, and Word Warriors.

She has nonfiction articles on poetry and politics in Encyclopædia Britannica, The First Encyclopedia of Activism and Social Change, The Encyclopedia of Activism and Social Justice, and Encyclopedia of Governance.

Her film, Do the Math, with award-winning director Mary Guzman was the 2006 winner of a Frameline Completion Grant and screened at Outfest 2007.

Awards and recognitions 
 Winner, 2002 Poetry Slam Championship (Oakland, California)
 Winner, 2002 People Before Profits Poetry Prize 
 Grant Recipient, Queer Cultural Center
 2006 Frameline Completion Grant 
 2006 LA Fusion film festival, Honorable Mention
 2016 Lambda Literary Award for Debut Fiction nominee for Life Is Wonderful, People Are Terrific

Performance 
Bañales performed regularly from 2000-2010 in the San Francisco Bay Area. She was one of the artists on tour with Sister Spit: The Next Generation (2007).

She sometimes performs under the moniker "Missy Fuego" and her name is often spelled "Meliza Banales". She was a cast member in the 2008 Dark Room Theater production of The Ten Commandments: Live!, and appeared in Lynnee Breedlove's short film Godspeed in 2007.

Other venues where Bañales has performed include Julia Serano's GenderEnders, Femina Potens, SFinX (SF in Exile), Mad to Live: Queers Under the Influence of the Beats  curated by Michelle Tea, the Queer Cultural Center, Litquake; and many more.

Works 
 For the Love of Things Not Said, Poemas (Chula Press, 2000)
 Scratching a Surface, Poemas Y Mas (Chula Press, 2001)
 Girl with the Glass Throat (Chula Press, 2001)
 and I've been fighting ever since (Chula Press, 2002)
 Say It With Your Whole Mouth (Monkey Press, 2003)
 Life Is Wonderful, People Are Terrific (Ladybox Books, 2015)

Sources

External links 
 Meliza Banales at Viva Variety 34 reading 'Do the Math', 2009.
 Meliza Bañales on MySpace

Poets from California
Living people
Year of birth missing (living people)
University of California, Santa Cruz alumni
American women poets
Writers from San Francisco
21st-century American poets
21st-century American women writers
American lesbian writers
LGBT Hispanic and Latino American people